In psychiatry, dysaesthesia aethiopica ("Black (Ethiopian) bad feeling) was an alleged mental illness described by American physician Samuel A. Cartwright in 1851, which proposed a theory for the cause of laziness among slaves. Today, dysaesthesia aethiopica is not recognized as a disease, but instead considered an example of pseudoscience, and part of the edifice of scientific racism.

History

Found exclusively among African Americans, dysaesthesia aethiopica – called rascality by the overseers – was characterized by partial insensitivity of the skin and "so great a hebetude of the intellectual faculties, as to be like a person half asleep." Other symptoms included "lesions of the body discoverable to the medical observer, which are always present and sufficient to account for the symptoms." Cartwright contended that the existence of dysaesthesia aethiopica was "clearly established by the most direct and positive testimony," but other doctors had failed to notice it because their "attention [had] not been sufficiently directed to the maladies of the negro race."

Cartwright felt that dysaesthesia aethiopica was "easily curable, if treated on sound physiological principles." Insensitivity of the skin was one symptom of the disease, so the skin should be stimulated:

Author Vanessa Jackson has noted that lesions were a symptom of dysaesthesia aethiopica and "the ever-resourceful Dr. Cartwright determined that whipping could ... cure this disorder. Of course, one wonders if the whipping were not the cause of the 'lesions' that confirmed the diagnosis."

According to Cartwright, after the prescribed "course of treatment" the slave will "look grateful and thankful to the white man whose compulsory power ... has restored his sensation and dispelled the mist that clouded his intellect."

According to Cartwright, dysaesthesia aethiopica was "much more prevalent among free negroes living in clusters by themselves, than among slaves on our plantations, and attacks only such slaves as live like free negroes in regard to diet, drinks, exercise, etc." – indeed, according to Cartwright, "nearly all [free negroes] are more or less afflicted with it, that have not got some white person to direct and to take care of them." He explicitly dismissed the opinion which assigned the causes of the "problematic" behaviour to the social situation of the slaves without further justifications: "[The northern physicians] ignorantly attribute the symptoms to the debasing influence of slavery on the mind."

See also
Drapetomania, the name given to what was seen at one point in time to be a mental illness that caused black slaves to flee captivity.
Scientific racism
Minority stress

References

Sources
 Samuel A. Cartwright, "Report on the Diseases and Physical Peculiarities of the Negro Race", The New Orleans Medical and Surgical Journal 1851:691-715 (May).
 Reprinted in DeBow's Review XI (1851). Available at Google Books and excerpted at PBS.org.
 Reprinted in Arthur Caplan, H. Tristram Engelhardt, Jr., and James McCartney, eds, Concepts of Health and Disease in Medicine: Interdisciplinary Perspectives (Boston: Addison-Wesley, 1980).
 Reprinted in Arthur L. Caplan, James J. McCartney, Dominic A. Sisti, eds, Health, Disease, and Illness: Concepts in Medicine (Washington, D.C.: Georgetown University Press, 2004) .

External links
An Early History - African American Mental Health

Scientific racism
Obsolete medical terms
Political abuses of psychiatry
Obsolete terms for mental disorders
Stereotypes of African Americans
Social problems in medicine
Slavery in the United States
Pseudoscience
Race and health in the United States
Psychiatric false diagnosis
History of psychology
Post-traumatic stress disorder